Everything Goes Numb is the debut studio album by American ska punk band Streetlight Manifesto, released on August 26, 2003. It garnered critical acclaim, with critics commenting on the quality of the band's lyrics and their powerful energy. The album has since acquired a cult following among fans of the Third Wave Ska movement. This is the first full-length album frontman and vocalist Tomas Kalnoky participated in since leaving the ska-punk band Catch 22. The track "If and When We Rise Again" quotes the melody of Hungarian Dance No. 5 by Johannes Brahms.

Track listing
All songs written by Tomas Kalnoky

Personnel
Josh Ansley - Bass Guitar
Jim Conti - Alto Saxophone, Clarinet, Tenor Saxophone
Jamie Egan - Trombone, Trumpet, Tuba
Tomas Kalnoky - Guitar, Layout, Lyrics, Music, Photos, Producing, Recording, Vocals
Paul Lowndes - Drum tracking, Drums
Dan Ross - Alto Saxophone, Baritone Saxophone

Additional personnel
Chris Bailey - Auxiliary Percussion
Jeff Davidson - Gang Vocals
Steve Ho - Gang Vocals
Jason Kanter - Mixing
Robbie Krieger - Cello (Track 12 only)
Lico - Gang Vocals
Dominick Maita - Mastering
Shane Thompson - Auxiliary Percussion
Natalia Ushak - Cover Model

References

External links

Everything Goes Numb at YouTube (streamed copy where licensed)

2003 debut albums
Streetlight Manifesto albums
Tomas Kalnoky albums
Victory Records albums